Daniel Jorge Barbosa Ramos, known as Daniel Materazzi (born 22 March 1985) is a Portuguese footballer who plays as a defender for Leça FC.

A journeyman who never spent more than two senior years at the same club, he made 149 LigaPro appearances over five consecutive seasons, each with a different team. He spent most of his career in the third tier, playing over 200 times in service of six teams.

Career
Born in Gondomar, Porto District, Materazzi played as a youth for FC Porto and S.C. Salgueiros. While at the latter, he received his nickname after Marco Materazzi, for his physical resemblance to the Italian international who played in the same position.

Having not broken into Salgueiros' team while the club was in the Segunda Liga, Materazzi dropped to the third tier, where he represented S.C. Freamunde, Rebordosa AC, Lusitânia FC, hometown club Gondomar S.C. and finally C.D. Tondela, whom he joined in 2011. In his first season with them, the club won promotion to the Segunda.

Materazzi remained in the second division, representing Leixões SC, C.D. Santa Clara, S.C. Olhanense and AD Fafe in one-year spells from 2013 to 2017. He left his two-year contract at Olhanense by mutual consent.

After leaving Fafe in 2017, Materazzi returned to Olhanense, now in the third-tier Campeonato de Portugal. He remained in the division, with Lusitânia again, Leça F.C. (two spells) and C.D. Trofense.

References

External links

Fora de Jogo statistics

1985 births
Living people
People from Gondomar, Portugal
Portuguese footballers
Liga Portugal 2 players
Campeonato de Portugal (league) players
S.C. Salgueiros players
S.C. Freamunde players
Rebordosa A.C. players
Lusitânia F.C. players
Gondomar S.C. players
C.D. Tondela players
Leixões S.C. players
C.D. Santa Clara players
S.C. Olhanense players
AD Fafe players
Leça F.C. players
C.D. Trofense players
Association football defenders
Sportspeople from Porto District